The Charles L. Baxter House is a historic house located at 77 Main Street in Barnstable, Massachusetts.

Description and history 
The -story Greek Revival wood-frame house was built c. 1858 by Charles L. Baxter, a local housewright who then lived there until his death. The house has an L-shaped layout, with the front entrance on the front of the main block, and a porch in the crook of the L. The house's corners are decorated with pilasters, as is the front door entry, which is topped by an entablature and lintel shelf.

The house was listed on the National Register of Historic Places on March 13, 1987.

See also
National Register of Historic Places listings in Barnstable County, Massachusetts

References

Houses in Barnstable, Massachusetts
National Register of Historic Places in Barnstable, Massachusetts
Houses on the National Register of Historic Places in Barnstable County, Massachusetts
Greek Revival architecture in Massachusetts
Houses completed in 1858